The Indian Super League Winning Pass of the League is an annual association football award presented to the leading assist provider in an Indian Super League season.

The Indian Super League was founded in 2013, eight teams competed in the 2014 inaugural season. It became the joint top-tier of Indian football league system by 2017–18 season and is the top-tier since 2022–23 season.

Indian Super League Winning Pass of the League was first awarded in 2016 and 2017–18 seasons for the best assist provided in the Indian Super League playoff finals. Since 2018–19 season, it has been awarded to the leading assist provider of a given Indian Super League season. Sameehg Doutie of ATK won the first award in 2016 and Arnold Issoko of Mumbai City won in 2018–19. The current holder is Alberto Noguera of Goa who won in 2020–21.

Winners

Awards won by nationality

Awards won by club

See also
 Indian Super League
 Indian Super League Golden Boot
 Indian Super League Hero of the League
 Indian Super League Golden Glove
 Indian Super League Emerging Player of the League

References

External links
 Indian Super League website

Winning Pass
Association football top assist provider awards
Awards established in 2016
2016 establishments in India
Annual events in India